Kul Prasad Pokhrel (Nepali:कुल पोखरेल) (September 21, 1981 – October 4, 2004) was a Nepalese singer-songwriter. He was popularly known by his stage name Cool Pokhrel and he was well known as a pop and folk music singer. He died in 2004, possibly of drug overdose.

Pokhrel was born in Sunwal City, Nepal. He was raised by his parents and he mostly preferred living with his relatives. He started singing at 11. While singing to his relatives they thought he would become one of the biggest singers of Nepal. Then he recorded a song called "" which became a blockbuster song. This led to him joining popular Nepali hip-hop group The Unity, building his career in the Nepali music industry.

He is known as (English: King of Nepali Pop) or simply "King of Pop" by Nepali and international audiences. Cool Pokhrel had many hit songs in Nepal such as "", "", "" and "". Cool has been remembered in other Nepalese pop songs by other popular singers such as Unity Band, Jhilkey Badal, Sugam Pokharel, and Girish Khatiwada; he has been recognized as a revolutionary singer in the history of pop music.

Personal life 
Kul Prasad Pokhrel was born on September 21, 1981 at Sunwal City, Nepal. After he moved to Pokhara to get SLC he studied at Gyanu Babu Boarding School, Pokhara. After successfully achieving his School Leaving Certificate he moved back to Sunwal City. In an interview he described his favourite place as Pokhara. Later he moved to London to get a diploma in Business Administration. When he was about to move to the United States to get higher education, he came back to Nepal to start a music career. His favourite singers were Bob Dylan, Kurt Cobain and Jhalak Man Gandarbha and his favorite hobby was watching Nepalese films.

Career

Early 2000s 
Cool Pokhrel started his career in 1999 with his first song ("") which became an instant hit in Nepal. His next album, called , was a success. His next album was called AAMA—its songs became a blockbuster in the Nepali music industry. Cool started collaborating with other artists such as Girish Khatiwada; their song appeared in Girish's Greatest Hits compilation album.

Death impact 
After his death at Patan hospital, which was confirmed by doctors to be a drug overdose, his fans were shocked. His last song project was "", which is now performed by Avinash Ghising. Fifteen years later, a pop artist remixed his song "", making a number of fans angry at Jhilkey Badal or Badal Parasi; however, it started Jhilkey Badal's career.

Musical style 
Cool mostly sang pop music throughout his musical career and recorded a few hip hop songs with his band, Girish Khatiwada, which were mostly hit songs. Topics mainly included personal issues and his family being role models. Several songs were dedicated to his family, such as "", meaning "Mother", and he also released an album for his family called , which became one of his most successful albums.

Discography

 means Listen My Love. This song refers to his love life and school love life. Songs included on this album are "" and "School". After the success of the solo song and album, he started working on his second album called  meaning "Mother", which was recorded for his mother and family. The popularity of his songs such as "" led to his music being enjoyed by teenagers.  was recorded together with other artists and produced by Music Nepal. The title song "" became widely known. He finished recording his last album in 2004 but it has not yet been released due to his death.

Death and legacy

Songs for Cool

 "Tribute" – Unity Band
 "" – Jhilkey Badal (original by Cool Pokharel)
 ""

Songs
""
""
""
""
""
""
""
""
""

References 

21st-century Nepalese male singers
1981 births
2004 deaths
People from Butwal